Vakiyarovo (Wäqiyär) is a rural locality (a village) in Yelanlinsky Selsoviet, Kiginsky District, Bashkortostan, Russia. The population was 445 as of 2010. There are 6 streets.

Geography 
Vakiyarovo is located 23 km south of Verkhniye Kigi (the district's administrative centre) by road. Yelanlino is the nearest rural locality.

References 

Rural localities in Kiginsky District